Brachymera is a genus of flies in the family Tachinidae.

Species
 Brachymera rugosa (Mik, 1863)

References

Tachinidae